This article lists the squads for the 2021 Turkish Women's Cup, the 4th edition of the Turkish Women's Cup. The cup consists of a series of friendly games, and is held in Turkey from 17 to 23 February 2021. The seven national teams and one domestic team involved in the tournament registered a squad of 23 players.

The age listed for each player is on 17 February 2021, the first day of the tournament. The numbers of caps and goals listed for each player do not include any matches played after the start of tournament. The club listed is the club for which the player last played a competitive match prior to the tournament. The nationality for each club reflects the national association (not the league) to which the club is affiliated. A flag is included for coaches that are of a different nationality than their own national team.

Group A

CSKA Moscow
Coach: Maksim Zinovyev

Equatorial Guinea
Coach:  Jean-Paul Mpila

Nigeria
Coach:  Randy Waldrum

The squad was announced on 11 February 2021. On 13 February 2021, Rasheedat Ajibade and Christy Ucheibe withdrew due to administrative reasons while Chiamaka Nnadozie and Ngozi Okobi-Okeoghene were exempt on health grounds.

Uzbekistan
Coach: Vadim Abramov

The squad was announced on 12 February 2021.

Group B

India
Coach: Maymol Rocky

The squad was announced on 12 February 2021.

Russia
Coach: Yuri Krasnozhan

The squad was announced on 11 February 2021.

Serbia
Coach: Predrag Grozdanović

The squad was announced on 14 February 2021.

Ukraine
Coach: Natalya Zinchenko

The squad was announced on 9 February 2021.

Player representation
The information represents only the seven national teams taking part in the competition.

By club
Clubs with 4 or more players represented are listed.

By club nationality

By club federation

By representatives of domestic league

References

2021